CHRR may refer to:

 Centre for Human Rights and Rehabilitation, a human rights non-governmental organisation in Malawi
 Cornell HR Review, an online journal of human resources management scholarship published by graduate students at Cornell University